Daniel's Harbour is a community on the west coast of Newfoundland, in the province of Newfoundland and Labrador.  Its population as reported by the 2021 Census was 220 people.  It has a reputation as a great place for wild whale sightings.

Climate
Daniel's Harbour has a subarctic climate (Koppen: Dfc) with June being under the  isotherm due to extreme seasonal lag caused by the cold Labrador Current. Summers are cool to mild while winters are freezing. Precipitation is heavy year round, though less heavy during spring.

Demographics 

See also
 List of cities and towns in Newfoundland and Labrador

References

Populated coastal places in Canada
Towns in Newfoundland and Labrador